Michael Jäger (born 1956 in Düsseldorf) is a German artist. He lives and works in Cologne.

External links
 Homepage Michael Jäger
 Homepage Galerie Witzel
 Homepage Galerie Frank Schlag & Cie

20th-century German painters
20th-century German male artists
German male painters
21st-century German painters
21st-century German male artists
1956 births
Living people
Date of birth missing (living people)
Artists from Düsseldorf